Cetonia is a genus of beetles in family Scarabaeidae. One of the most familiar species is the rose chafer (C. aurata).

Species

 Names brought to synonymy
 Cetonia elegans Leoni, 1910, a synonym for Cetonia aurata pisana, a subspecies (Cetoniini) of the rose chafer
 Cetonia elegans Fabricius, 1781, a synonym for Heterorrhina elegans, a species (Goliathini) found in India and Sri Lanka

References

Johan Christian Fabricius : Genera insectorum (1777)

External links

The genus Cetonia on Fauna Europaea

Scarabaeidae genera
Cetoniinae
Taxa named by Johan Christian Fabricius